The 2010 KNSB Dutch Sprint Championships in speed skating were held at the Kardinge ice stadium in Groningen, Netherlands.

Schedule

Medalist

Results

Men's Sprint

Note:
DNS = Did Not Start

Men's results: SchaatsStatistieken.nl

Women's Sprint

Note:
DNS = Did Not Start
DQ = Disqualified

Women's results: SchaatsStatistieken.nl

References

KNSB Dutch Sprint Championships
KNSB Dutch Sprint Championships
2010 Sprint
Sports competitions in Groningen (city)